The Calgary Outlaws were a professional basketball franchise based in Calgary, Alberta, in 1994. The Outlaws were members of the National Basketball League.

The Outlaws played its home games at the Jack Simpson Gymnasium at the University of Calgary and occasionally Olympic Saddledome.

Sources
NBL Statistics

National Basketball League (Canada) teams
Out
Defunct basketball teams in Canada
Basketball teams in Alberta
1994 establishments in Alberta
1994 disestablishments in Alberta
Basketball teams established in 1994
Basketball teams disestablished in 1994